Christos Dimopoulos (born 6 September 1959) is a retired Greek footballer who played as a forward for PAOK and Panathinaikos F.C.. His nickname was "Fonias" (Φονιάς, meaning Killer) of Greek football. Alongside his brothers Thanasis Dimopoulos and Spyros he holds the world record for the highest number of siblings scoring on the same day, on 2 February 1992 in the Greek first division.

Career
Dimopoulos was born in Gastouni, Greece. He started his professional career in Aias Gastounis. He played for PAOK from 1980 to 1985, scoring 47 league goals in 112 appearances and 5 UEFA Europa League goals in 8 appearances with the club. At the end of the 1985 season, Dimopoulos signed to Panathinaikos and later played professional with Athinaikos F.C. and Kalamata F.C. He finished his career playing with PAE Pyrgos at Fourth Division during 1994–95 season. Throughout his career, he made 10 appearances for the Greece national football team.

Nowadays, he is believed to be one of the best strikers in PAOK history.

References

1959 births
Living people
People from Gastouni
Greek footballers
Super League Greece players
Panetolikos F.C. players
PAOK FC players
Panathinaikos F.C. players
Athinaikos F.C. players
Kalamata F.C. players
Greece international footballers
Association football forwards
Footballers from Western Greece